John Knott (3 July 1914 – 2 October 1965) was a British sports shooter. He competed in the 300 m rifle event at the 1948 Summer Olympics.

References

External links
 John Knott, his rifles, and his 1950s journal "The Marksman"

1914 births
1965 deaths
British male sport shooters
Olympic shooters of Great Britain
Shooters at the 1948 Summer Olympics
Sportspeople from Epsom
20th-century British people